Premawanthayo (The Lovers) is a 2004 Sri Lankan Sinhala drama film directed by Nishantha de Alwis and produced by Susan Fernando. It stars Swarna Mallawarachchi and Simon Navagattegama in lead roles along with Nadeeka Gunasekara and Jayalath Manoratne. Music composed by Athula Somasiri. It is the 1036th Sri Lankan film in the Sinhala cinema.

Plot

Cast
 Swarna Mallawarachchi
 Simon Navagattegama
 Nadeeka Gunasekara
 Indrajith Navinna
 Gothami Pathiraja
 Mervyn Jayatunga
 Jayalath Manoratne
 Francis Wanniarachchi
 Elson Divithurugama
 Seetha Kumari

References

2004 films
2000s Sinhala-language films